Alienus curiosus is a species of beetle in the family Cerambycidae, and the only species in the genus Alienus. It was described by Galileo and Martins in 2010.

References

Eligmodermini
Beetles described in 2010